An election to Neath Port Talbot County Borough Council was held on 4 May 2017 as part of wider local elections across Wales. The election was preceded by the 2012 election. Four candidates (from the sixty four seats available) were elected unopposed. 

Labour maintained control of the authority.

Ward results
Nominations closed on 4 April 2017.

The following results were announced following the elections. In the case of wards electing more than one councillor the percentage figures reflect the number of ballot papers issues rather than the total number of votes.

Aberavon (three seats)
Ceri Golding and Mark Jones were elected as Labour candidates in 2012

Aberdulais (one seat)

Alltwen (one seat)

Baglan (three seats)

Blaengwrach (one seat)

Briton Ferry East (one seat)
Colin Morgan was elected as a Labour candidate in 2012.

Briton Ferry West (one seat)

Bryn and Cwmavon (three seats)

Bryncoch North (one seat)

Bryncoch South (two seats)

Cadoxton (one seat)

Cimla (two seats)

Coedffranc Central (two seats)

Coedffranc North (one seat)

Coedffranc West (one seat)

Crynant (one seat)

Cwmllynfell (one seat)
Kris Lloyd had held the seat for Labour at a by-election following the death of the previous councilor.

Cymmer (one seat)
Scott Jones stood down from the Labour Party in 2018

Dyffryn (one seat)

Glyncorrwg  (one seat)

Glynneath (two seats)

Godre'r Graig (one seat)

Gwaun Cae Gurwen (one seat)

Gwynfi (one seat)

Lower Brynamman (one seat)

Margam (one seat)

Neath East (three seats)

Neath North (two seats)

Neath South (two seats)

Onllwyn (one seat)

Pelenna (one seat)

Pontardawe (two seats)

Port Talbot (three seats)

Resolven (one seat)

Rhos (one seat)

Sandfields East (three seats)

Sandfields West (three seats)
Chaves and Evans were deselected as Labour candidates and stood as Independents.

Seven Sisters (one seat)

Taibach (two seats)

Tonna (one seat)

Trebanos (one seat)

Ystalyfera (one seat)

By-Elections 2017-2022

Bryncoch South by-election 2017
A by-election was held in Bryncoch South on 23 November 2017 following the death of Plaid Cymru councillor, Janice Dudley.

Gwynfi by-election 2018
A by-election was held in Gwynfi on 16 August 2018 following the resignation of Labour Councillor, Ralph Thomas, after a secondary school was closed by the Council

Resolven by-election 2019
A by-election was held in Resolven on 23 May 2019 following the death of Labour Councillor, Des Davies, a member of the Council since its formation in 1995.

Pelenna by-election 2019
A by-election was held in Pelenna on 20 June 2019 following the death of Independent Councillor, Martin Ellis.

Rhos by-election 2019
The by-election was caused by the resignation of Labour councillor Alex Thomas.

Aberavon by-election 2021
A by-election was held in Aberavon on 6 May 2021 following the death of Labour Councillor, Steffan ap Dafydd.

References

2017
2017 Welsh local elections